Little Pink House is a 2017 American-Canadian biographical drama film written and directed by Courtney Moorehead Balaker and starring Catherine Keener as Susette Kelo.  It is based on the book "Little Pink House" by Jeff Benedict, which chronicles events related to Kelo v. City of New London, a U.S. Supreme Court case in which Kelo unsuccessfully sued the city of New London, Connecticut, for its controversial use of eminent domain.

Plot
A small-town paramedic named Susette Kelo emerges as the reluctant leader of her working-class neighbors in their struggle to save their homes from political and corporate interests bent on seizing the land and handing it over to Pfizer Corporation. Ambitious academic Dr. Charlotte Wells, president of the fictional "Walthrop College" (in real life, Connecticut College President Claire Gaudiani) persuades the current governor (John G. Rowland, unnamed in the movie) that this could help his public image by increasing tax revenue for the poor. Susette's battle goes all the way to the U.S. Supreme Court and the controversial 5–4 decision in Kelo vs. City of New London gave government officials the power to bulldoze a neighborhood for the benefit of a multibillion-dollar corporation. The decision outraged Americans across the political spectrum, and that passion fueled reforms that helped curb eminent domain abuse.

Cast
 Catherine Keener as Susette Kelo
 Jeanne Tripplehorn as Charlotte Wells
 Aaron Douglas as Governor
 Callum Keith Rennie
 Colin Cunningham as Billy Von Winkle
 Giacomo Baessato as Scott Bullock

Reception
On review aggregator website Rotten Tomatoes, the film holds an approval rating of 76%, based on 29 reviews, and an average rating of 6.19/10. The website's critics consensus reads: "Little Pink House rises up on the foundation of Catherine Keener's strong central performance, even if its fact-based story never quite fills in the framework. On Metacritic, the film has a weighted average score of 55 out of 100, based on 13 critics, indicating "mixed or average reviews".

A bipartisan congressional screening of the film was held at the U.S. Capitol.

Accolades 
 Winner, HBO Audience Choice Award, Provincetown International Film Festival
 Winner, Audience Choice Award, Vail Film Festival
 Winner, Jimmy Stewart Legacy Award, Heartland Film Festival
 Winner, Best Feature, Rainier Independent Film Festival
 Winner, Grand Prize, Anthem Film Festival
 Winner, Best Narrative, Anthem Film Festival
 Winner, Best Original Score, Anthem Film Festival
 Winner, Best Casting, Leo Awards
 Finalist, Athena List
 Nominee, The Faith and Freedom Award for Movies, Movieguide Awards
 Nominee, Best Picture, Leo Awards
 Nominee, Best Production Design, Leo Awards
 Nominee, Best Costume Design, Leo Awards

References

External links
 
 

2017 films
English-language Canadian films
Canadian biographical drama films
American biographical drama films
American courtroom films
Films set in Connecticut
Drama films based on actual events
2017 biographical drama films
2017 drama films
Films produced by Joel Soisson
2010s English-language films
2010s American films
2010s Canadian films